Kuraby railway station is located on the Beenleigh line in Queensland, Australia. It serves the Brisbane suburb of Kuraby. Kuraby is the final station on the Beenleigh Line in the City of Brisbane, with the next station, Trinder Park, located in Logan City.

History
Kuraby station opened in 1885 as Spring Creek being renamed Kuraby in 1889. In 1998 work commenced on a third platform to allow Gold Coast line services to overtake Beenleigh line services.

In 2008, an upgrade of the station was completed as part of the Salisbury to Kuraby triplication project. The upgrade included a new footbridge with lifts.

Services
Kuraby station is served by all stops Beenleigh line services from Beenleigh to Bowen Hills and Ferny Grove. Two evening peak hours trains services from Brisbane terminate at Kuraby. While Kuraby has two services that begin in the morning peak hour and run into Bowen Hills

Services by platform

References

External links

Kuraby station Queensland's Railways on the Internet
[ Kuraby station] TransLink travel information

Railway stations in Brisbane
Railway stations in Australia opened in 1885